Ferdinandea is a genus of syrphid flies or hoverflies in the family Syrphidae. There are about 16 described species in Ferdinandea.

Species
These 16 species belong to the genus Ferdinandea:

 Ferdinandea aeneicolor Shannon, 1924
 Ferdinandea aurea Rondani, 1844
 Ferdinandea buccata (Loew, 1863)
 Ferdinandea croesus (Osten Sacken, 1877)
 Ferdinandea cuprea (Scopoli, 1763)
 Ferdinandea dives (Osten Sacken, 1877)
 Ferdinandea formosana Shiraki, 1930
 Ferdinandea fumipennis Kassebeer, 1999
 Ferdinandea isabella Hull, 1942
 Ferdinandea longifacies Coe, 1964
 Ferdinandea luteola Mutin, 1999
 Ferdinandea maculipennis Curran, 1928
 Ferdinandea montana Hull, 1942
 Ferdinandea nepalensis Claussen & Weipert, 2003
 Ferdinandea nigripes (Osten Sacken, 1877)
 Ferdinandea ruficornis (Fabricius, 1775)

References

Further reading

 

Eristalinae
Hoverfly genera
Taxa named by Camillo Rondani